Tropidothrinax is a genus of flies in the family Pyrgotidae, containing a single species, Tropidothrinax boliviensis.

References 

Pyrgotidae
Diptera of South America
Monotypic Brachycera genera
Taxa named by Günther Enderlein